In the Hindu varna system, Brahmakshatriya may refer to a Brahmin who pursues royalty, and hence concurrently adopts the Kshatriya varna.

Brahmakshatriya dynasties
 Sena Dynasty: The founder of the Sena rule was Samantasena who described himself as a Brahma-Kshatriya of Karnataka (Karnataka). He stated that he fought the outlaws of Karnataka and later turned into an ascetic. The inscriptions of the Sena kings mention them as Brahma-Kshatriyas (Brahmins who ruled as Kshatriyas) or Kshatriyas.

In Kerala 
In Kerala, only the sons of a Nambuthiri father and a Kshatriya mother were recognized as Brahmakshatriya by the Nambuthiri Brahmins, while the son of a Brahmakshatriya father and a non-Kshatriya mother was regarded as non-Kshatriya. The Nambudiri Brahmins and Samantha Arasu Ballalas of Kasaragod are examples of Brahmkshatriyas by descent, while the Nambiathiri and Nambidi sect of Nambudiri Brahmins are Brahmkshatriyas by adopting a martial tradition.

In Gujarat 
In Gujarat, the Brahmakshatriyas as a community exists that bears cross caste identity. They are generally considered as a writer caste.

See also 
 Rajpurohit 
 Pushpaka Brahmin
 Khatri
 Bhumihar
 Pathare Prabhu 
 Chandraseniya Kayastha Prabhu
 Mohyal
 Tyagi
 Niyogi
 Chitpavan
 Bengali Kayastha 
 Baidya

References

Kshatriya
Brahmins